is a Japanese professional golfer with over a dozen wins on the LPGA of Japan Tour.

Career
Narita was born in Ichihara, Chiba. As an amateur, she won the Kanto Junior Golf and East Japan Women's Public Amateur, and dropped out of Nippon Sport Science University to play golf professionally on the LPGA of Japan Tour. She saw immediate success, winning the 2012 Fujitsu Ladies and the 2012 Rookie of the Year Award. By 2014, after she won her first JLPGA Major, the World Ladies Championship Salonpas Cup, she featured in the top-50 on the Women's World Golf Rankings.  

Narita finished 5th on the JLPGA money list in 2014 and 2018, earning her starts at the U.S. Women's Open and Women's British Open. She made her first JLPGA hole-in-one at the third round of 2016 Nipponham Ladies Classic. By 2019, she became one of 30 golfers with JLPGA career earnings in excess of half a billion yen.

She represented Japan at the 2018 International Crown and on the winning The Queens teams in 2015 and 2017.

In 2018, she was awarded the JLPGA Shiseido Anessa Beauty of the Year.

Professional wins (13)

LPGA of Japan Tour wins (13)

Tournaments in bold denotes major tournaments in LPGA of Japan Tour.

Results in LPGA majors
Results not in chronological order before 2019.

CUT = missed the half-way cut
T = tied

Summary

 Most consecutive cuts made – 1 (three times)
 Longest streak of top-10s – 0

Team appearances
The Queens (representing Japan): 2015 (winners), 2017 (winners)
International Crown (representing Japan): 2018
Hitachi 3Tours Championship (representing LPGA of Japan Tour): 2014 (winners)

References

External links

Japanese female golfers
LPGA of Japan Tour golfers
Sportspeople from Chiba Prefecture
1992 births
Living people
21st-century Japanese women